The men's 100 metre breaststroke competition of the swimming events at the 2011 Pan American Games took place on October 16 at the Scotiabank Aquatics Center in Mexico. The defending Pan American Games champion was Scott Dickens of Canada.

This race consisted of two lengths of the pool, both being in breaststroke.

Records
Prior to this competition, the existing world and Pan American Games records were as follows:

Qualification
Each National Olympic Committee (NOC) was able to enter up to two entrants providing they had met the A standard (1:04.7) in the qualifying period (January 1, 2010 to September 4, 2011). NOCs were also permitted to enter one athlete providing they had met the B standard (1:06.6) in the same qualifying period.

Results
All times are in minutes and seconds.

Heats
The first round was held on October 16.

B Final 
The B final was also held on October 16.

A Final
The A final was also held on October 16.

References

Swimming at the 2011 Pan American Games